Lee Hodges may refer to:

Lee Hodges (footballer, born 1973), English footballer from Epping, who played for Plymouth Argyle and Barnet
Lee Hodges (footballer, born 1978), English footballer from Plaistow, who played for Scunthorpe United and Bristol Rovers